Bukit Panjang Public Library is a public library in Bukit Panjang, Singapore. It is located inside Bukit Panjang Plaza and the nearest station to it is Bukit Panjang MRT/LRT station. It is also near the Bukit Panjang Bus Interchange. It is the fourth public library owned by the National Library Board to be located inside a mall.

History 
The library was called Bukit Panjang Community Library before 2009. Its name was changed to Bukit Panjang Public Library on 2010. It was officially opened on 4 April 1998 by Dr Teo Ho Pin, who was the then Member of Parliament for Sembawang GRC (Bukit Panjang Division).

Renovation 
On 4 September 2016, the library underwent a 10-month renovation, opening on 1 July 2017. It now has 2 wings that are facing each other on the 4th floor. The Adults' and Teens' Zone are in the old library space while the Children's Zone is in the space previously occupied by Daiso. The library was officially reopened by Minister for Communications and Information Dr Yaacob Ibrahim.

There are also colour-coded strips to guide people at the library.

Layout 
The library consists of two separate zones, an Adult and Teen zone, and a Children's zone.

Adults' and Teens' Zones 
 AV
 Magazines
 Newspapers
 Fiction
 Non fiction
 Chinese books
 Malay books
 Tamil books
 Teens

Children's Zone 
 Family & parenting
 Books for babies
 Picture books
 Novels
 AV
 Magazines
 Singapore
 Chinese books
 Malay books
 Tamil books

See also 
 National Library Board
 Libraries in Singapore

References

External links 
 National Library Board

Bukit Panjang
Libraries in Singapore
1998 establishments in Singapore
Libraries established in 1998